The following low-power television stations broadcast on digital or analog channel 2 in the United States:

 K02AO-D in Eureka, Montana
 K02EE-D in Weaverville, California
 K02EG-D in Ursine, Nevada
 K02IK-D in Gateview, Colorado
 K02JG-D in Prospect, Oregon
 K02JJ-D in Williams, Oregon
 K02JO-D in Caliente, Nevada
 K02KN-D in Kanarraville, etc., Utah
 K02LH-D in Clarks Fork, Wyoming
 K02LJ-D in Nondalton, Alaska
 K02NV-D in Sargents, Colorado
 K02OD-D in Shelter Cove, California
 K02OG-D in Dolores, Colorado
 K02OS-D in Weber Canyon, Colorado
 K02OU-D in Ismay Canyon, Colorado
 K02QI-D in Hesperus, Colorado
 K02QP-D in Chowchilla, California
 K02QW-D in Reno, Nevada
 K02RA-D in Beaumont, Texas
 K02RI-D in Cedar City Canyon, Utah
 K02RJ-D in Kalispell & Lakeside, Montana
 K02RL-D in Indio, California
 K15JZ-D in Applegate Valley, Oregon
 K18LJ-D in Dunsmuir, etc., California
 KBFY-LD in Fortuna, Arizona
 KBRO-LD in Lyons, Colorado, an ATSC 3.0 station
 KCPM-LP in Fargo, North Dakota
 KFAK-LD in Boise, Idaho
 KFTY-LD in Middletown, California
 KHIZ-LD in Los Angeles, California
 KLNK-LD in Groveton, Texas
 KQRO-LD in Morgan Hill, California
 KSFW-LD in Dallas, Texas
 KTNR-LD in Laredo, Texas
 W02CS-D in Ponce, Puerto Rico
 W02CT-D in Arecibo, Puerto Rico
 W02CY-D in New York, New York
 W41DO-D in New York, New York, to move to channel 33
 WASA-LD in Port Jervis, New York, uses WKOB-LD's spectrum, to move to channel 13
 WESL-LP in Jamestown, Kentucky
 WHNH-CD in Manchester, etc., Vermont
 WKWT-LD in Key West, Florida
 WLMO-LD in Fort Wayne, Indiana
 WRIW-CD in Providence, Rhode Island, uses WSBE-TV's full-power spectrum
 WUVM-LD in Atlanta, Georgia

The following low-power stations, which are no longer licensed, formerly broadcast on analog or digital channel 2:
 K02AW in Virgin, Utah
 K02BU in Green River, Utah
 K02EQ in Paris, Texas
 K02ET in Vallecito, Colorado
 K02FA in Antimony, Utah
 K02FF in Lakehead, California
 K02FQ in Escalante, Utah
 K02FT in Gold Hill, Oregon
 K02FZ in Winthrop, Washington
 K02GE in La Barge, Wyoming
 K02GL in Dorena, etc., Oregon
 K02HH in Parker, Arizona
 K02HO in Unalaska, etc., Alaska
 K02HY in Ridgecrest, etc., California
 K02IB in Homer, etc., Alaska
 K02ID in Yakutat, Alaska
 K02IQ in Squaw Valley, etc., Oregon
 K02JE in McGrath, Alaska
 K02JH in Salida, etc., Colorado
 K02JI in Angoon, Alaska
 K02JU in Selawik, Alaska
 K02JX in Bridgeport, etc., California
 K02KB in Allakaket, Alaska
 K02KK in Cantwell, Alaska
 K02KS in Ryndon, etc., Nevada
 K02KX in Chevak, Alaska
 K02KZ-D in Kobuk, Alaska
 K02LA in Red Devil, Alaska
 K02LW in Gustavus, Alaska
 K02ME in Womens Bay, Alaska
 K02MN in Levelock, Alaska
 K02NU in Cedar City, etc., Utah
 K02OI in Montezuma Creek-Aneth, Utah
 K02OK in Beowawe, etc., Nevada
 K02OP in Collbran, Colorado
 K02OT in East Price, Utah
 K02PJ in La Grande, Oregon
 K02PU in Bluff & area, Utah
 K02QB in Alexandria, Louisiana
 K02QM-D in Lemon, etc., Alaska
 K02RM-D in Wendover, Nevada
 KCWQ-LP in Palm Springs, California
 KITM-LD in Lahaina, Hawaii
 KYAN-LD in Los Angeles, California
 W02AU-D in St. Francis, Maine
 W02CF in Minocqua, Wisconsin
 WUVF-LP in Naples, Florida

References

02 low-power